Fifteenmile Creek is a tributary stream of East Deep Creek, in Juab County, Utah and Tooele County, Utah.

It flows north northwest to its confluence with an unnamed stream, at an elevation of 6,025 feet / 1,836 meters, 0.75 miles north of Goshute. There the confluence forms East Deep Creek, ten and a half miles south southeast of Ibapah.

References 

Rivers of Juab County, Utah
Rivers of Tooele County, Utah